The following television stations broadcast on digital channel 44 in the United States:

 K44EN-D in Methow, Washington, to move to channel 36

The following stations, which are no longer licensed, formerly broadcast on digital channel 44 in the United States:
 K44AK-D in Memphis, Texas
 K44CC-D in Gruver, Texas
 K44CG-D in Capulin, etc., New Mexico
 K44FH-D in Coos Bay, Oregon
 K44HA-D in Preston, Idaho
 K44KR-D in Salinas, California
 K44LG-D in Anderson/Pineville, Missouri
 K44LL-D in Austin, Nevada
 KIDT-LD in Stamford, Texas
 KSDI-LD in Fresno, California
 W44CT-D in Albany, New York
 W44CU-D in Florence, South Carolina
 W44CV-D in Utuado, Puerto Rico
 W44DK-D in Clarksburg, West Virginia
 WLPH-CD in Miami, Florida
 WNDS-LD in Ocala, Florida
 WNYS-TV in Syracuse, New York

References

44 digital